Corcelles-les-Arts is a commune in the Côte-d'Or department in eastern France.

Population

Mass Castle 
Mass Castle is in Corcelles-les-Arts and is a fifteenth century castle built in southeast Burgundy region of France. It has been registered as a historic monument since 1976. This castle, fully restored and inhabited, has square walls with a small tower at each corner, and a classic style interior. The land surrounding Mass Castle was used for the mass production of consumer wine as late as the nineteenth century.

References

Communes of Côte-d'Or